The 1923 Copa del Rey Final was the 23rd final of the Spanish cup competition, the Copa del Rey. The final was played at Les Corts, in Barcelona, on 13 May 1923. Athletic Bilbao beat Europa 1–0 and won their ninth title. The lonely goal was scored by Travieso.

Match details

References
linguasport.com
RSSSF.com

1923
Copa
Athletic Bilbao matches
CE Europa matches
May 1923 sports events